Manor House is a station on the Piccadilly line of the London Underground, on the boundary between Travelcard Zone 2 and Zone 3. It straddles the border between the London Boroughs of Hackney and Haringey, the postal address and three of the entrances being in the former, and one entrance in the latter.

Description
The station is situated at the junction of Seven Sisters Road and Green Lanes. Named after the former public house that used to be located on the crossroads, it was designed by Charles Holden and opened on 19 September 1932. It is situated between Finsbury Park and Turnpike Lane stations.

Like all stations on the Cockfosters extension, Manor House station set new aesthetic standards, not previously seen on London's Underground. The sub-surface areas of the station were tiled in biscuit coloured tiles lined with blue friezes (refurbished in 2005).

When first constructed, the station was equipped with nine street level entrances, two of which gave access to tram routes to and from Tottenham, Edmonton and Stamford Hill via tramway island exits into Seven Sisters Road. The  last of these tram services were withdrawn in 1938 and replaced by trolleybuses and the exits were removed in 1951.

The station tunnels have, in common with those of Turnpike Lane and Wood Green, a diameter of 23 feet (7 metres) and were designed for the greater volume of traffic expected. In contrast, Bounds Green and Southgate have only 21 foot (6.4 metres) diameter platform tunnels. The construction of "suicide pits" between the rails was also innovative. These were built in connection with a system of passageways under the platforms to give access to the track.

Next to the northern exit are the remains of a tramway track, which leads into the rear of the former Metropolitan Electric Tramways Headquarters (M.E.T) building, later the Eastern Divisional Office of London Transport Buses.

Plan to transfer station to the Victoria line
During the planning of the Victoria line, a proposal to transfer Manor House station to the Victoria line was put forward. New tunnels were also proposed for the Piccadilly line between Finsbury Park and Turnpike Lane, which would have considerably reduced the travelling time from outer North London to Central London. The inconvenience caused during re-construction, as well as the cost, ensured that the ideas were not pursued.

The Victoria line tunnels as built run underneath the station.  At the northern end of the eastbound (towards Cockfosters) platform one can hear Victoria line trains running beneath.

Connections
London Buses routes 29, 141, 253, 254, 259, 279 and 341 and night routes N29, N253 and N279 serve the station.

Gallery

References

Piccadilly line stations
London Underground Night Tube stations
Tube stations in the London Borough of Hackney
Tube stations in the London Borough of Haringey
Former London Electric Railway stations
Railway stations in Great Britain opened in 1932
Charles Holden railway stations